The Women's Allam British Open 2015 is the women's edition of the 2015 British Open Squash Championships, which is a PSA World Series event Platinum (Prize money: $100 000). The event took place at the Sports Arena in Hull in England from 11 May to 17 May. Camille Serme won her first British Open trophy, beating Laura Massaro in the final.

Prize money and ranking points
For 2015, the prize purse was $100,000. The prize money and points breakdown is as follows:

Seeds

Draw and results

See also
2015 PSA World Series
2015 Men's British Open

References

External links
WISPA British Open 2015 website
British Open 2015 official website 

Women's British Open Squash Championships
Women's British Open
Women's British Open Squash Championship
Squash in England
Sport in Kingston upon Hull
2010s in Kingston upon Hull
British Open
Women's British Open Squash Championship